Events in the year 1714 in Norway.

Incumbents
Monarch: Frederick IV

Births
1 February – Nicolaus Christian Friis, priest and writer (died in 1777).

See also

References